The 2016–17 season was the 107th season of competitive football in Germany.

Promotion and relegation

Pre–season

Post–season

National teams

Germany national football team

2018 FIFA World Cup qualifying

2018 FIFA World Cup qualifying UEFA Group C

2017 FIFA Confederations Cup

Germany won the FIFA Confederations Cup for the first time with a 1–0 victory over Chile in the final.

Friendly matches

Germany women's national football team

UEFA Women's Euro 2017 qualifying

2016 Summer Olympics

2017 SheBelieves Cup

UEFA Women's Euro 2017

Friendlies

League season

Men

Bundesliga

Bundesliga standings

2. Bundesliga

2. Bundesliga standings

3. Liga

3. Liga standings

German clubs in Europe

UEFA Champions League

Play-off round

|}

Group stage

Group C

Group D

Group E

Group F

Knockout phase

Round of 16

|}

Quarter-finals

|}

UEFA Europa League

Third qualifying round

|}

Group stage

Group C

Group I

Knockout phase

Round of 32

|}

Round of 16

|}

Quarter-finals

|}

UEFA Women's Champions League

Round of 32

|}

Round of 16

|}

Quarter-finals

Sources

 
Seasons in German football